Norberto Osvaldo Alonso (born 4 January 1953), known colloquially as "Beto" Alonso, is an Argentine former football midfielder, who played the majority of his career for the Argentine club River Plate, where he won 9 titles. He remains one of their most notable players.  Alonso was regularly regarded as one of the best South American players in the world during the 1970s.

He stands in fifth place in River Plate's all time goalscoring records with 149 goals  and 7th place in their all time appearances record with 374 matches played. A former Copa Libertadores, Intercontinental Cup and FIFA World Cup champion.

Club career

Alonso was born in Vicente López, Buenos Aires province, but grew up in the poor suburb of Los Polvorines. An attacking midfielder, he rose through the ranks of River's youth divisions as the team was undergoing its infamous dry spell (18 years, 1957 to 1975, without a championship title). When Angel Labruna took the reins in 1975, Alonso was the team's anchor and holder of the No. 10 jersey.

With reinforcements Roberto Perfumo and Ubaldo Fillol, and the maturing of players like Daniel Passarella, Carlos Morete, J. J. López and Reinaldo Merlo, Alonso led the squad that won both the Metropolitano and the Nacional tournaments of 1975, ushering in a series of seven local titles in the period 1975–1981.

In 1976, Alonso was transferred to Olympique Marseille, but he was unsuccessful. River Plate arranged for his return in 1977.

Between the years 1979–1981, River won four local titles, and became one of the most expensive teams in the world, with a first team (Alonso-Luque) playing in league games and an equally prestigious second team (Carrasco-Ramón Díaz) used mostly in Copa Libertadores matches.

During the 1981 "Nacional" tournament (which River would eventually win), Alonso often clashed with then coach Alfredo Di Stéfano (who seldom selected him for the first team and instead put younger players such as Carlos Daniel Tapia and José María Vieta in his position). After the Nacional, Alonso was put on the transfer list and was sold to Vélez Sársfield on 1982. After playing alongside veteran Carlos Bianchi, he returned to River Plate once again for the 1984 season.

Many talented midfielders emerged from River Plate's youth system during Alonso's reign, including Alejandro Sabella, Néstor Gorosito and Pedro Troglio.

Alonso was a key player of the successful team of 1985–86 that won River Plate's first Copa Libertadores and Intercontinental Cup. In 1985, his main partner was Enzo Francescoli. By the time he retired, he had scored 166 goals in 464 matches.

International career
Although he was included in the Argentine squad, Alonso was not in the plans of coach César Luis Menotti for the 1978 FIFA World Cup. Menotti gave Alonso only a few minutes of play during the tournament, as Argentina went on to win the competition on home soil.

For the 1978 World Cup, Argentina numbered players alphabetically, and as a result Alonso (a midfielder) wore the number 1 jersey (usually reserved for goalkeepers).

In 1983, national coach Carlos Bilardo gave Alonso some playing time, but eventually used younger players Diego Maradona, Jorge Burruchaga, and Carlos Tapia in his position.

Post-retirement

After retiring from the pitch, Alonso opened an insurance agency. He was also a partner in several commercial ventures, even though he was not an advertising figurehead: his appeal for non-River fans was limited, and Maradona was Argentina's poster boy after his exploits in the 1986 World Cup.

Together with Merlo, Alonso coached River Plate in 1989, but the duo was dismissed mid-season when new club president Alfredo Davicce made good on an election promise to bring in Daniel Passarella as coach. River eventually went on to win the championship.

Career statistics

Club

Honours
River Plate

 Primera División: 1975 Nacional, 1975 Metropolitano, 1979 Nacional, 1979 Metropolitano, 1980 Metropolitano, 1981 Nacional, 1985–86
 Copa Libertadores: 1986
 Intercontinental Cup: 1986
Argentina

 FIFA World Cup: 1978

References

External links

Alonso's statistics at River Detroit
 Profile and Statistics at Futbolistasblogspotcom.blogspot.com

1953 births
Living people
People from Vicente López Partido
Argentine footballers
Association football midfielders
Club Atlético River Plate footballers
Olympique de Marseille players
Club Atlético Vélez Sarsfield footballers
1978 FIFA World Cup players
Copa Libertadores-winning players
FIFA World Cup-winning players
Argentina international footballers
Argentine Primera División players
Ligue 1 players
Argentine expatriate footballers
Expatriate footballers in France
Argentine expatriate sportspeople in France
Sportspeople from Buenos Aires Province